Chitram Cheppina Katha is an unreleased Telugu-language mystery film about a man who searches the secrets of his past, starring Uday Kiran and Madalasa Sharma, his last film before his suicide.  The audio launch of this film was attended by his family. The film was scheduled to be released in 2017, but has not released as of now. The movie is tentatively scheduled to be released on 28th December 2022, on Amazon Prime Video.

Cast
 Uday Kiran
 Madalasa Sharma
 Garima Jain

References

Indian mystery films
Unreleased Telugu-language films